Edmund Yard Robbins (29 May 1867 in Windsor, New Jersey – 30 May 1942 in Princeton, New Jersey) was an American philosopher. He was Ewing Professor of the Greek Language and Literature at Princeton University. In 1889, he obtained a Bachelors, and in 1890 a master's degree from Princeton. From 1891 to 1894, he furthered his studies at the University of Leipzig. On his return he was as an instructor at Princeton University in Greek. In 1897 he was appointed assistant professor. After his graduation to Doctor of Letters with unpublished work of the Greek orator Isaeus (1901), he was appointed full professor in 1902. In 1910, he succeeded S. Stanhope Orris in the Ewing Professorship. From 1921 to 1922 he was professor at the Annual American School of Classical Studies at Athens. In 1936 he became professor emeritus.

He was a member of the American Philological Association in 1895, and died on 30 May 1942. In his honor in 1949, the Edmund Y. Robbins Fellowships were established in Classics.

References

1867 births
1942 deaths
People from Robbinsville Township, New Jersey
Princeton University alumni
Leipzig University alumni
Princeton University faculty
American philologists
Scholars of Greek language
19th-century American philosophers
19th-century philologists
20th-century American philosophers
20th-century philologists